Richland is a small unincorporated community and census-designated place (CDP) in Union County, South Dakota, United States. The population was 97 at the 2020 census.

Demographics

History
In 1861, the community was founded by and named after Milton M. Rich of Chicago.  Mr. Rich was reported to have dreamed of building a community below the bluffs.  However, it was also reported that Mr. Rich disagreed with railroad officials on how to divide the site of the town.  The dispute was never resolved; and as a result, the railroad was deflected to Sioux City, Iowa after reaching Le Mars, Iowa.

References

External links
History of Richland, South Dakota

Unincorporated communities in Union County, South Dakota
Unincorporated communities in South Dakota
Populated places established in 1861
Sioux City metropolitan area
1861 establishments in Dakota Territory